Syntaxin-1B is a protein that in humans is encoded by the STX1B gene.

Interactions 

STX1B has been shown to interact with UNC13B.

References

Further reading